Dopádromo (Drug-O-Rama) is the third album by Argentine rock group Babasónicos.

Track listing
 "Zumba" (Hum)
 "El Médium" (The Medium)
 "Cybernecia" (Cyberfool)
 "Safari Vixen"
 "¡Viva Satana!" (Long Live Satana!)
 "Perfume Casino" (Casino Perfume)
 "Calmática"
 "Coyarama"
 "Su Majestad" (Your Majesty)
 "Pesadilla Biónica del Perro Biónico" (Bionic Nightmare of the Bionic Dog)
 "Gronchótica"
 "Su Ciervo" (Her Deer)

Trivia

"¡Viva Satana!" refers to actress Tura Satana, famous because of her appearance in various sexploitation films of the 60's, most notably Faster Pussycat! Kill! Kill!.
"Gronchótica" samples the main theme from Shaw Brothers studios' "The drug addicts".
"Safari vixen" starts with a sample from the theme from Mario Bava's film "Shock".
"Su Ciervo" is a play on words, as "Siervo" means "serf" or "slave",  and "Ciervo", though pronounced exactly the same way, means "deer".

References

1996 albums
Babasónicos albums